-John P. Conn House is a historic home located at Uniontown, Fayette County, Pennsylvania. It was built in 1906, and is a large -story, square brownstone dwelling in the Colonial Revival style. It has a slate-covered hipped roof with gable dormer. It features a colossal balconied porch with paired Corinthian order columns.  Also on the property is a contributing wood-frame garage.

It was added to the National Register of Historic Places in 1988.

References

Houses on the National Register of Historic Places in Pennsylvania
Colonial Revival architecture in Pennsylvania
Houses completed in 1906
Houses in Fayette County, Pennsylvania
Uniontown, Pennsylvania
National Register of Historic Places in Fayette County, Pennsylvania
1906 establishments in Pennsylvania